Benkadi may refer to:

Benkadi, Koulikoro, Mali
Benkadi, Sikasso, Mali